Chaughada is a village development committee in Nuwakot District in the Bagmati Zone of central Nepal. At the time of the 1991 Nepal census, it had a population of 5795 living in 1010 individual households.

References

External links
 UN map of the municipalities of Nuwakot District

Populated places in Nuwakot District